The Namibia Food and Allied Workers Union (NAFAU) is a trade union in Namibia affiliated with the National Union of Namibian Workers (NUNW). In 2020 it had a self-reported membership of 15,000. NAFAU's organizational strongholds include the fishing industries around Walvis Bay and Lüderitz.

History
NAFAU was founded on 20 September 1986. Originally led by the late political prisoner John Pandeni, the Union was the first NUNW-affiliated industrial union in Namibia.

See also

References

Trade unions in Namibia
International Trade Union Confederation
Windhoek
Food processing trade unions
Trade unions established in 1986
1986 establishments in South West Africa